The Quadrennial comprehensive policy review (QCPR) of the operational system of the United Nations is a process and a United Nations General Assembly resolution by which the 193 members of the United Nations General Assembly (UN GA) review the coherence effectiveness and funding of the 27 UN development programmes, funds, and specialised agencies of the UN operational system for development. This review was conducted on a triennial basis until 2007. Since 2008 it has been conducted on a quadrennial basis.

Typically, the Quadrennial comprehensive policy review covers the following subjects: 
 The funding of operational activities of the UN for development including the core funding of its agencies, funds and programmes
 The role of the UN development system in building capacity and fostering development in developing countries
 The responsibility of the UN development system in the global fight against poverty
 The responsibility of the UN development system in promoting South-South cooperation and the development of national capacities
 The importance of placing gender equality and women’s empowerment at the center of the agenda of the UN development system
 Guidance to the UN development system on its operations in countries in transition from relief to development
 Instructions to improve the functioning of the UN development system, and particularly the simplification and harmonization of its business practices

The substantive basis for this review is a report by the Secretary-General of the United Nations which is produced by the United Nations Department of Economic and Social Affairs (UN DESA) during the summer preceding the UN GA negotiations. This report is then debated in the second committee of the UN GA. The negotiation of the resolution has historically been chaired by the economic and development counselor of the Permanent Mission of Switzerland to the United Nations (Olivier Chave 2001 and 2004, Thomas Gass 2007, Pio Wennubst 2012).

The implementation of the Quadrennial comprehensive policy review is carried out through the United Nations Economic and Social Council (ECOSOC).

References

Further reading 
 Post 2015: What It Means for the United Nations Development System, Pio Wennubst and Timo Mahn, Briefing Paper 13/2013, German Development Institute / Deutsches Institut für Entwicklungspolitik (DIE)
 A Resolution for a Quiet Revolution: Taking the United Nations to Sustainable Development ‘Beyond Aid’, Pio Wennubst and Timo Mahn, Discussion Paper 22/2013, German Development Institute /Deutsches Institut für Entwicklungspolitik (DIE)

External links 
 United Nations Economic and Social Council website on QCPR
 United Nations Department of Economic and Social Affairs website on QCPR 
 United Nations Development Group website on QCPR

United Nations General Assembly resolutions